Johannes Schubert is an Austrian film producer.

Biography 
Schubert studied for a bachelor's degree in Film and Television Production at the Film University Babelsberg Konrad Wolf in Potsdam, Germany, from 2014 to 2018. Between 2019 and 2021, he completed a master's degree in Producing at the National Film and Television School in Beaconsfield, England.

Filmography 
2017: Kontener

2018: Germania

2018: Mascarpone

2018: Una Primavera

2021: Dear Future Children

2021: The Clearing

2022: Laika & Nemo

2023: Club Zero

References

External links 
Official website

Living people
1990 births